Michael Pickering may refer to:

 Michael Pickering (footballer, born 1941) (1941–1995), Australian rules footballer for North Melbourne
 Michael Pickering (footballer, born 1963), former Australian rules footballer for Richmond and Melbourne
 Mick Pickering (born 1956), English association footballer in the 1970s and 1980s
 Mike Pickering (born 1958), English musician who founded Quando Quango and M People